China Hospitality Technology Alliance (CHTA) is the largest Chinese non-profit organization for the technological product and technology development of the domestic hotel and the education and training of IT practitioners in the hotel industry.

History 

The China Hospitality Technology Alliance was founded by Jing Zhu. She is also the CEO of 3D Networks.

In March 2013, the China Hospitality Technology Alliance announced an alliance with the Hospitality Financial and Technology Professionals to share strategic industry information about each other's regional markets.

In September 2015, the China Hospitality Technology Alliance made a partnership with the Hospitality Financial and Technology Professionals to share resources in education and certification processes. In April 2016, the China Hospitality Technology Alliance made its first round of product certification.

In January 2019, the CHTA Sponsored with the China Hotel Association the creation of the Security Response Center of China Hospitality Industry, a platform aiming to fight cyber risks in the hospitality industry.

See also 
 Hotel Technology Next Generation

References

External links 
 Official website

Information technology in China
Business organizations based in China
Hospitality companies of China